The Chihuahuan fringe-toed lizard (Uma paraphygas) is a species of lizard in the family Phrynosomatidae. It is endemic to Mexico.

References

Uma
Endemic reptiles of Mexico
Reptiles described in 1959
Taxa named by Hobart Muir Smith
Taxa named by Kenneth L. Williams